Edith Belle Gelles is an American author and historian. She grew up in Lake Placid, New York and attended Cornell University, Yale University, and the University of California, Irvine. She is currently a Senior Scholar at the Clayman Institute for Gender Research at Stanford University where she has been a faculty member since 1983. Her scholarship is primarily in the area of early American history, concentrating on biography and women. She is known for her scholarship and writing about Abigail Adams and her husband John.

Publications

Books
 Portia: The World of Abigail Adams (1996) Indiana University Press.
 The Letters of Abigaill Levy Franks, 1733–1748: Letters of Abigaill Levy Franks 1733–1748 (2004) Yale University Press.
 Abigail and John: Portrait of a Marriage (2009) William Morrow.
 Abigail Adams: Letters (Edith Gelles, Ed.). (2016). Library of America.
 Abigail Adams: A Writing Life. (2017) Routledge.
 Gale Researcher Guide for John and Abigail Adams and the Revolution in Marriage (2018) Gale Publishing.

Journal articles
 Abigail Adams: Domesticity and the American Revolution. (1979). The New England Quarterly, 52(4), 500–521. 
 A Virtuous Affair: The Correspondence Between Abigail Adams and James Lovell. (1987). American Quarterly, 39(2), 252–269.
 The Abigail Industry. (1988). The William and Mary Quarterly, 45(4), 656–683. 
 Gossip: An Eighteenth-Century Case. (1989). Journal of Social History, 22(4), 667–683.
 Bonds of Friendship: The Correspondence of Abigail Adams and Mercy Otis Warren. (1996). Proceedings of the Massachusetts Historical Society, 108, 35–71.
 The Adamses Retire. (2006). Early American Studies, 4(1), 1–15.

See also
 Colonial history of the United States
 History of women in the United States

References

Notes

Citations

External links
 Faculty page, Senior Scholar, Clayman Institute for Gender Research; Stanford University.
 The Clayman Institute for Gender Research, Stanford University.
 Distinguished Lecturer Profile, Organization of American Historians.



21st-century American historians
20th-century American historians
Stanford University faculty
Living people
Historians from California
Historians from New York (state)
Cornell University alumni
Year of birth missing (living people)